Frank Zhigang Wang is a Chinese computer scientist and Professor of Future Computing and a former Head of the School of Computing at the University of Kent, England.

He was previously Professor and Chair in e-Science and Grid Computing, Director of Centre for Grid Computing, Cambridge-Cranfield High Performance Computing Facility. In 1994, he invented spin-tunneling random access memory. In 2003, Frank proposed a new concept of Grid-oriented Storage architecture. In 2004, Frank and his colleagues launched the UK-first Masters Program in Grid Computing. In 2005, he was elected as the Chairman of UK & Republic of Ireland Chapter of the IEEE Computer Society. In 2007, he was elected as a Fellow of the British Computer Society.

External links
Official website of Frank Zhigang Wang

References

Living people
Year of birth missing (living people)
Fellows of the British Computer Society
Chinese computer scientists
Academics of the University of Kent